The James Cook House, at 1017 11th in Las Vegas, New Mexico, was listed on the National Register of Historic Places in 1985.

It is a "Hipped Box" style house, which may be termed New Mexico vernacular in style.

References

New Mexico vernacular architecture
National Register of Historic Places in San Miguel County, New Mexico